Under the Influence is the fourth studio album by American men's singing group Straight No Chaser. It was released in the US on May 7, 2013, and peaked at number 28 on the U.S. Billboard 200.  In 2014, the album was reissued as a version called the Under the Influence (Ultimate Edition), which included the all tracks from the original album and the Holiday Edition EP.

Holiday Edition
Later the same year, Straight No Chaser released a follow-up holiday EP titled Under the Influence: Holiday Edition on October 29, 2013, teaming up with several featured artists, such as Paul McCartney, Colbie Caillat, CeeLo Green, and the late Otis Redding.  This EP reached number 33 on the Billboard 200, and number 4 on the Billboard Top Holiday Albums chart.

For the 2014 holiday season, the group recorded a new comedic holiday duet titled "Text Me Merry Christmas" with Kristen Bell, and reissued the EP to include the track.

Track listing

Chart performance

Release history

Reception
The Washington Post called the original album a fun listen, although there was nothing cutting edge to the album.

References

2013 albums
Pop rock albums by American artists
Atco Records albums
Atlantic Records albums
Straight No Chaser (group) albums